Miguel Ortíz may refer to:
Miguel Ortiz Vélez, mayor of Sabana Grande, Puerto Rico
Miguel Ortiz (seaQuest DSV), a character on the TV series seaQuest DSV
Miguel Ortiz, better known as the professional wrestler Halloween